The 2022–23 New Orleans Pelicans season is the 21st season of the New Orleans Pelicans franchise in the National Basketball Association (NBA).

Draft 

The Pelicans held one first-round pick and two second-round picks entering the draft.

Roster

Standings

Division

Conference

Game log

Preseason

|- style="background:#cfc;"
| 1
| October 4
| @ Chicago
| 
| Devonte' Graham (21)
| Jaxson Hayes (6)
| Jose Alvarado (6)
| United Center16,322
| 1–0
|- style="background:#cfc;"
| 2
| October 7
| Detroit
| 
| Jose Alvarado (28)
| Willy Hernangómez (8)
| Daniels, Valančiūnas (5)
| Smoothie King Center13,309
| 2–0
|-style="background:#cfc;
| 3
| October 9
| @ San Antonio
| 
| Trey Murphy III (27)
| Willy Hernangómez (11)
| Devonte' Graham (6)
| AT&T Center18,193
| 3–0
|- style="background:#fcc;"
| 4
| October 12
| @ Miami
| 
| Willy Hernangómez (17)
| Naji Marshall (8)
| Williamson, McCollum, Marshall (4)
| FTX Arena19,600
| 3–1
|-style="background:#cfc;"
| 5
| October 14
| Atlanta
| 
| Brandon Ingram (19)
| Jonas Valančiūnas (11)
| Jonas Valančiūnas (7)
| Legacy Arena12,787
| 4–1

Regular season

|- style="background:#cfc;"
| 1
| October 19
| @ Brooklyn
| 
| Brandon Ingram (28)
| Jonas Valančiūnas (15)
| CJ McCollum (6)
| Barclays Center18,003
| 1–0
|- style="background:#cfc;"
| 2
| October 21
| @ Charlotte
| 
| Jonas Valančiūnas (30)
| Jonas Valančiūnas (17)
| Brandon Ingram (7)
| Spectrum Center19,287
| 2–0
|-style="background:#fcc;
| 3
| October 23
| Utah
| 
| CJ McCollum (28)
| Murphy III, Valančiūnas (9)
| CJ McCollum (12)
| Smoothie King Center18,665
| 2–1
|- style="background:#cfc;"
| 4
| October 25
| Dallas
| 
| Trey Murphy III (22)
| Jonas Valančiūnas (7)
| CJ McCollum (11)
| Smoothie King Center14,020
| 3–1
|- style="background:#fcc;"
| 5
| October 28
| @ Phoenix
| 
| Jonas Valančiūnas (25)
| Jonas Valančiūnas (10)
| CJ McCollum (9)
| Footprint Center17,071
| 3–2
|-style="background:#cfc;"
| 6
| October 30
| L.A. Clippers
| 
| CJ McCollum (22) 
| Zion Williamson (12)
| Zion Williamson (7)
| Crypto.com Arena18,142
| 4–2
|-

|-style="background:#fcc;"
| 7
| November 2
| @ L.A. Lakers
| 
| Zion Williamson (27) 
| Jonas Valančiūnas (10)
| CJ McCollum (8)
| Crypto.com Arena18,997
| 4–3
|-style="background:#cfc;"
| 8
| November 4
| Golden State
| 
| Brandon Ingram (26) 
| McCollum, Nance Jr. (8)
| Ingram, McCollum (5)
| Smoothie King Center18,451
| 5–3
|- style="background:#fcc;"
| 9
| November 5
| @ Atlanta
| 
| McCollum, Williamson (29)
| Jonas Valančiūnas (17)
| Brandon Ingram (7)
| State Farm Arena17,654
| 5–4
|- style="background:#fcc;"
| 10
| November 7
| @ Indiana
| 
| Brandon Ingram (29)
| Valančiūnas, Williamson (7)
| McCollum, Williamson (7)
| Gainbridge Fieldhouse14,052
| 5–5
|- style="background:#cfc;"
| 11
| November 9
| @ Chicago
| 
| Brandon Ingram (22)
| Jonas Valančiuñas (13)
| CJ McCollum (5)
| United Center19,621
| 6–5
|-style="background:#fcc;
| 12
| November 10
| Portland
| 
| Zion Williamson (29)
| Jonas Valančiuñas (11)
| CJ McCollum (7)
| Smoothie King Center14,289
| 6–6
|- style="background:#cfc;
| 13
| November 12
| Houston
| 
| Zion Williamson (26)
| Larry Nance Jr. (9)
| CJ McCollum (7)
| Smoothie King Center15,367
| 7–6
|-style="background:#cfc;"
| 14
| November 15
| Memphis
| 
| CJ McCollum (30)
| Dyson Daniels (9)
| CJ McCollum (9)
| Smoothie King Center14,032
| 8–6
|-style="background:#cfc;"
| 15
| November 16
| Chicago
| 
| CJ McCollum (23)
| Trey Murphy III (10)
| Brandon Ingram (9)
| Smoothie King Center14,658
| 9–6
|-style="background:#fcc;"
| 16
| November 18
| Boston
| 
| Brandon Ingram (25)
| Larry Nance Jr. (8)
| Brandon Ingram (7)
| Smoothie King Center17,828
| 9–7
|-style="background:#cfc;"
| 17
| November 21
| Golden State
| 
| Brandon Ingram (34)
| Jonas Valančiuñas (13)
| Naji Marshall (7)
| Smoothie King Center18,589
| 10–7
|-style="background:#cfc;"
| 18
| November 23
| @ San Antonio
| 
| Zion Williamson (32)
| Zion Williamson (11)
| Brandon Ingram (10)
| AT&T Center14,947
| 11–7
|- style="background:#fcc;"
| 19
| November 25
| @ Memphis
| 
| Trey Murphy III (21)
| Daniels, Hernangómez, Jones, Williamson (5)
| Dyson Daniels (6)
| FedExForum17,794
| 11–8
|- style="background:#cfc;"
| 20
| November 28
| Oklahoma City
| 
| Zion Williamson (23)
| Jonas Valančiuñas (10)
| Zion Williamson (8)
| Smoothie King Center13,109
| 12–8
|- style="background:#cfc;"
| 21
| November 30
| Toronto
| 
| Zion Williamson (33)
| Jonas Valančiuñas (13)
| Dyson Daniels (9)
| Smoothie King Center14,845
| 13–8

|- style="background:#cfc;"
| 22
| December 2
| @ San Antonio
| 
| Zion Williamson (30)
| Zion Williamson (15)
| Zion Williamson (8)
| AT&T Center17,202
| 14–8
|- style="background:#cfc;"
| 23
| December 4
| Denver
| 
| Jose Alvarado (38)
| Willy Hernangómez (8)
| Marshall, McCollum (6)
| Smoothie King Center15,658
| 15–8
|-style="background:#cfc;"
| 24
| December 7
| Detroit
| 
| Zion Williamson (29)
| Jonas Valančiūnas (12)
| Murphy III, Valančiūnas (5)
| Smoothie King Center14,073
| 16–8
|-style="background:#cfc"
| 25
| December 9
| Phoenix
| 
| Zion Williamson (35)
| Jonas Valančiūnas (10)
| McCollum, Nance Jr. (5)
| Smoothie King Center16,381
| 17–8
|-style="background:#cfc"
| 26
| December 11
| Phoenix
| 
| Zion Williamson (35)
| Jonas Valančiūnas (10)
| Dyson Daniels (8)
| Smoothie King Center18,681
| 18–8
|-style="background:#fcc"
| 27
| December 13
| @ Utah
| 
| Zion Williamson (26)
| Zion Williamson (9)
| Zion Williamson (5)
| Vivint Arena18,206
| 18–9
|-style="background:#fcc"
| 28
| December 15
| @ Utah
| 
| Zion Williamson (31)
| Nance Jr., Valančiūnas (9)
| Zion Williamson (8)
| Vivint Arena18,206
| 18–10
|-style="background:#fcc"
| 29
| December 17
| @ Phoenix
| 
| Zion Williamson (30)
| Jonas Valančiūnas (8)
| Zion Williamson (9)
| Footprint Center17,071
| 18–11
|-style="background:#fcc"
| 30
| December 19
| Milwaukee
| 
| Jonas Valančiūnas (37)
| Jonas Valančiūnas (18)
| CJ McCollum (9)
| Smoothie King Center18,271
| 18–12
|-style="background:#cfc"
| 31
| December 22
| San Antonio
| 
| CJ McCollum (40)
| Jonas Valančiūnas (10)
| CJ McCollum (9)
| Smoothie King Center16,417
| 19–12
|-style="background:#cfc"
| 32
| December 23
| @ Oklahoma City 
| 
| Trey Murphy III (23)
| Naji Marshall (8)
| CJ McCollum (11)
| Paycom Center15,214
| 20–12
|-style="background:#cfc"
| 33
| December 26
| Indiana 
| 
| Naji Marshall (22)
| Jonas Valančiūnas (12)
| CJ McCollum (6)
| Smoothie King Center18,636
| 21–12
|-style="background:#cfc"
| 34
| December 28
| Minnesota
| 
| Zion Williamson (43)
| Jonas Valančiūnas (11)
| CJ McCollum (6)
| Smoothie King Center18,669
| 22–12
|-style="background:#cfc"
| 35
| December 30
| Philadelphia
| 
| CJ McCollum (42)
| Jonas Valančiūnas (9)
| CJ McCollum (5)
| Smoothie King Center18,656
| 23–12
|-style="background:#fcc"
| 36
| December 31
| @ Memphis
| 
| Zion Williamson (20)
| Herbert Jones (11)
| Naji Marshall (4)
| FedExForum17,951
| 23–13

|-style="background:#fcc"
| 37
| January 2
| @ Philadelphia
| 
| McCollum, Williamson (26)
| Jonas Valančiūnas (12)
| Zion Williamson (7)
| Wells Fargo Center20,531
| 23–14
|-style="background:#cfc"
| 38
| January 4
| Houston
| 
| CJ McCollum (28)
| Jonas Valančiūnas (17)
| CJ McCollum (6)
| Smoothie King Center17,295
| 24–14
|-style="background:#fcc"
| 39
| January 6
| Brooklyn
| 
| CJ McCollum (28)
| Jonas Valančiūnas (10)
| CJ McCollum (6)
| Smoothie King Center18,636
| 24–15
|-style="background:#fcc"
| 40
| January 7
| @ Dallas
| 
| Jonas Valančiūnas (25)
| Hernangómez, Valančiūnas (10)
| Jose Alvarado (7)
| American Airlines Center20,300
| 24–16
|- style="background:#cfc"
| 41
| January 9
| @ Washington
| 
| CJ McCollum (34)
| Jonas Valančiūnas (12)
| Devonte' Graham (6)
| Capital One Arena16,223 
| 25–16
|- style="background:#fcc"
| 42
| January 11
| @ Boston
| 
| CJ McCollum (38)
| Naji Marshall (7)
| CJ McCollum (4)
| TD Garden19,156
| 25–17
|-style="background:#cfc"
| 43
| January 13
| @ Detroit
| 
| Jonas Valančiūnas (33)
| Jonas Valančiūnas (16) 
| CJ McCollum (9)
| Little Caesars Arena18,989
| 26–17
|-style="background:#fcc"
| 44
| January 16
| @ Cleveland
| 
| CJ McCollum (25)
| Jonas Valančiūnas (13)
| Jose Alvarado (5)
| Rocket Mortgage FieldHouse19,432 
| 26–18
|-style="background:#fcc"
| 45
| January 18
| Miami
|  
| CJ McCollum (21) 
| Jonas Valančiūnas (10)
| Larry Nance Jr. (6) 
| Smoothie King Center17,736
| 26–19
|-style="background:#fcc" 
| 46
| January 20
| @ Orlando
| 
| CJ McCollum (23)
| Jonas Valančiūnas (10)
| Dyson Daniels (8)
| Amway Center19,025
| 26–20
|-style="background:#fcc" 
| 47
| January 22
| @ Miami
| 
| Trey Murphy III (17) 
| Jonas Valančiūnas (16)
| Dyson Daniels (6)
| Miami-Dade Arena19,600 
| 26–21
|-style="background:#fcc"  
| 48
| January 24
| Denver
| 
| CJ McCollum (20)
| Jonas Valančiūnas (9)
| CJ McCollum (4)
| Smoothie King Center14,699 
| 26–22
|-style="background:#fcc"   
| 49
| January 25
| Minnesota
| 
| CJ McCollum (25)
| Jonas Valančiūnas (12)
| CJ McCollum (8)
| Smoothie King Center14,887 
| 26–23
|-style="background:#fcc" 
| 50
| January 28
| Washington
| 
| CJ McCollum (24)
| Larry Nance Jr. (8)
| CJ McCollum (5)
| Smoothie King Center17,692
| 26–24
|-style="background:#fcc"
| 51
| January 29
| @ Milwaukee
| 
| Jose Alvarado (18)
| Larry Nance Jr. (12)
| Alvarado, Marshall (6)
| Fiserv Forum17,341
| 26–25
|-style="background:#fcc"
| 52
| January 31
| @ Denver
|  
| Jones, McCollum (21)
| Larry Nance Jr. (11)
| Brandon Ingram (9) 
| Ball Arena18,868 
| 26–26

|-style="background:#fcc"
| 53
| February 2
| @ Dallas
|  
| Brandon Ingram (26)
| Jonas Valančiūnas (13)
| CJ McCollum (8)
| American Airlines Center19,670
| 26–27
|-style="background:#cfc;"
| 54
| February 4
| L.A. Lakers
| 
| Brandon Ingram (35)
| Jonas Valančiūnas (14)
| CJ McCollum (7)
| Smoothie King Center18,886
| 27–27
|-style="background:#cfc;"
| 55
| February 5
| Sacramento
| 
| Trey Murphy III (30)
| Willy Hernangómez (16)
| Hernangómez, Lewis Jr., Marshall, McCollum (4)
| Smoothie King Center17,779
| 28–27
|-style="background:#cfc;"
| 56
| February 7
| Atlanta
| 
| Brandon Ingram (30)
| Jonas Valančiūnas (14)
| Brandon Ingram (8)
| Smoothie King Center16,669
| 29–27
|-style="background:#fcc;"
| 57
| February 10
| Cleveland
| 
| Brandon Ingram (25)
| Jonas Valančiūnas (7)
| Brandon Ingram (8)
| Smoothie King Center16,398
| 29–28
|-style="background:#cfc;"
| 58
| February 13
| @ Oklahoma City
| 
| Brandon Ingram (34)
| Jonas Valančiūnas (8)
| Marshall, Nance Jr., Richardson (3)
| Paycom Center14,920
| 30–28
|-style="background:#fcc;"
| 59
| February 15
| @ L.A. Lakers
| 
| Brandon Ingram (25)
| Hernangómez, Valančiūnas (11)
| CJ McCollum (9)
| Crypto.com Arena18,997
| 30–29
|-style="background:#fcc;"
| 60
| February 23
| @ Toronto
| 
| Brandon Ingram (36)
| Jonas Valančiūnas (12)
| CJ McCollum (5)
| Scotiabank Arena19,800
| 30–30
|-style="background:#fcc;"
| 61
| February 25
| @ New York
| 
| Brandon Ingram (19)
| Jonas Valančiūnas (10)
| McCollum, Richardson (4)
| Madison Square Garden19,812
| 30–31
|-style="background:#fcc;"
| 62
| February 27
| Orlando
| 
| Brandon Ingram (25)
| Ingram, Jones, Marshall (6)
| CJ McCollum (6)
| Smoothie King Center16,038
| 30–32

|-style="background:#cfc;"
| 63
| March 1
| @ Portland
| 
| Brandon Ingram (40)
| Hernangómez, McCollum (7)
| CJ McCollum (7)
| Moda Center18,566
| 31–32
|-style="background:#fcc;"
| 64
| March 2
| @ Golden State
| 
| CJ McCollum (25)
| Hernangómez, McCollum (6)
| Jones, McCollum (5)
| Chase Center18,064
| 31–33
|-style="background:#fcc;"
| 65
| March 6
| @ Sacramento
| 
| Brandon Ingram (24)
| Jonas Valančiūnas (12)
| Herbert Jones (8)
| Golden 1 Center17,708
| 31–34
|-style="background:#cfc;"
| 66
| March 8
| Dallas
| 
| CJ McCollum (32)
| Herbert Jones (9)
| Daniels, Marshall (6)
| Smoothie King Center 17,473 
| 32–34
|-style="background:#fcc;"
| 67
| March 11
| Oklahoma City 
| 
| CJ McCollum (26)
| Hayes, Marshall (8)
| CJ McCollum (8)
| Smoothie King Center17,606
| 32–35
|-style="background:#cfc;"
| 68
| March 12
| Portland 
| 
| Trey Murphy III (41)
| Jonas Valančiūnas (12)
| CJ McCollum (11)
| Smoothie King Center16,676
| 33–35
|-style="background:#fcc;"
| 69
| March 14
| L.A. Lakers 
| 
| Brandon Ingram (22)
| Herbert Jones (7)
| CJ McCollum (9)
| Smoothie King Center18,625
| 33–36
|-style="background:#fcc;"
| 70
| March 17
| @ Houston
| 
| Brandon Ingram (31)
| Jonas Valančiūnas (17)
| Ingram, McCollum (6)
| Toyota Center15,841
| 33–37
|-style="background:#cfc;"
| 71
| March 19
| @ Houston
| 
| Ingram, McCollum (26)
| Jonas Valančiūnas (12)
| CJ McCollum (9) 
| Toyota Center14,209
| 34–37

Transactions

Free agents

Subtractions

References 

New Orleans Pelicans
New Orleans Pelicans seasons
New Orleans Pelicans
New Orleans Pelicans